Oswald Lutz (6 November 1876 – 26 February 1944) was a German General who oversaw the motorization of the German Army in the late 1920s and early 1930s and was appointed as the commander of the Wehrmacht's Panzer Troops Command in 1935.

Biography
Born in Öhringen, Lutz joined the Bavarian Army as an officer cadet in 1894 and was commissioned as a Leutnant in the 1st Bavarian Engineer Battalion in 1896. After service in the German Imperial Army in World War I, he was retained in the Reichswehr, in which he attained the rank of oberstleutnant in 1923 and oberst in 1928.

On 1 April 1931, Lutz was appointed the Inspector of Motor Transport Troops. Promoted to generalmajor, Oberstleutnant Heinz Guderian was appointed his chief-of-staff and Major Walter Nehring later joined his staff. Both men would go on to be influential in the establishment of the Panzerwaffe. Lutz continued to oversee the motorization of the army and was promoted to generalleutnant on 1 February 1933. Two and a half years later, he was promoted again to General der Panzertruppe and was made commander of the Panzer Troops Command. However, he lost Guderian as his chief-of-staff; he was given command of a panzer division. Guderian's replacement, Friedrich Paulus, was not effective and the momentum of the development of the Panzerwaffe slowed as Lutz was much less energetic. 

Lutz was retired from active duty in February 1938 after falling from Adolf Hitler's favour. During World War II he was recalled to service and appointed on 22 September 1941 to head a minor special staff unit before being retired again on 31 May 1942. He died in Munich in 1944 aged 67.

Notes

References
 

1876 births
1944 deaths
People from Öhringen
People from the Kingdom of Württemberg
Military personnel of Bavaria
Recipients of the Iron Cross (1914), 1st class
Lieutenant generals of the Reichswehr
Generals of Panzer Troops